Adhinayakudu is a 2012 Indian Telugu-language action film, produced by M. L. Padma Kumar Chowdhary under Sree Keerthi Creations banner, directed by Parachuri Murali and cinematography by T. Surendra Reddy. The film stars Nandamuri Balakrishna, Jayasudha, Lakshmi Rai, Sukanya, Saloni with Pradeep Rawat, Aditya Menon, Kota Srinivasa Rao, Murali Sharma, Rahman and Brahmanandam in supporting roles and music composed by Kalyani Malik. Balakrishna played a triple role as a grandfather, father and son for the first time on screen in this film.

Plot
Harischandra Prasad (Nandamuri Balakrishna) is an influential leader in Rayalaseema, and he treats all his people as his children. To provide jobs to them, he decides to build a huge steel plant with the assistance of foreign collaborators. But Ramappa (Pradeep Rawat) and his assistant (Kota Srinivasa Rao) oppose this. They hatch a plan to eliminate him. His son Ramakrishna (Nandamuri Balakrishna) thwarts the villain's plans. But the story takes a cruel twist as the villains strike at the heart of the family by using Bobby (Nandamuri Balakrishna). When Bobby was a small Kid, the villains kidnap him and threaten Ramakrishna to leave his father and save Bobby. Although Harischandra Prasad has no love for Ramakrishna, he loved his father, and for fulfilling his father's wishes, he stands to protect, and Bobby is said to be escaped from the house. But Ramappa and his followers make Bobby a professional killer at the age of 12 by another killer (Charanraj) and use him to kill Harischandra Prasad. The whole family, except Ramakrishna and his step-brother (Rahman), is unaware that Bobby killed Harischandra Prasad.

Now Bobby is an adult and is a high-profile professional killer and returns to his land with the help of his newly found friend Deepu (Lakshmi Rai), who share mutual love interest. His mission, in short, is to protect his father from Ramappa. In this process, it is revealed to the family members of Harischandra Prasad and the people that Bobby killed Harischandra Prasad and Moreover, the antagonists frame Ramakrishna as the man behind the Death of Harischandra. Frustrated and deeply hurt by this, Ramakrishna's Step Mother (Jayasudha) and wife (Sukanya) and the people expel them both. Police arrest them and take them away for a secret encounter by Ramappa. Seeing this all, Ramakrishna's stepbrother, who was paralyzed earlier in an attempt to catch Bobby during the murder of Harischandra, springs back to life and reveals the whole truth to his family and the people. Meanwhile, Ramkrishna and Bobby team up and kill all the enemies together. Later Ramakrishna's stepmother apologizes for the ill-treatment by her and orders him to fulfill his dead father's wishes.

Cast

 Nandamuri Balakrishna in a triple role as Harishchandra Prasad, Rama Krishna Prasad, and Bobby
 Lakshmi Rai as Deepti
 Jayasudha as Lakshmi 
 Sukanya as Rama Krishna Prasad's wife
 Saloni as Shravani
 Pradeep Rawat as Ramappa
 Aditya Menon as Ramappa's brother
 Kota Srinivasa Rao as Politician
 Rahman as Rama Krishna Prasad's brother
 Murali Sharma as DGP
 Brahmanandam as Brahmi
 Charanraj as Professional Killer
 Venu Madhav as Petty Thief
 Kasi Viswanath as Minister
 M. S. Narayana
 Amit Tiwari
 John Kokken as Minister's son
 Sabbah as Secretary

Crew
Art: Chinna
Choreography: Nobel, Prem Rakshith, Raghu, Papi
Stills: Raghunath Jupalli
Fights: Ram Lakshman
Lyrics: Bhaskarabhatla, Ramajogayya Sastry 
Playback:S. P. Balasubrahmanyam, Mano, Kalyani Malik, Rita, Chaitra Ambadipudi, Neha
Music: Kalyani Malik
Editing: Kotagiri Venkateswara Rao
Cinematography: T. Surendra Reddy
Producer: M. L. Padma Kumar Chowdhary
Story - Screenplay - Dialogues - Director: Parachuri Murali
Banner: Sree Keerthi Creations 
Release Date: 1 June 2012

Soundtrack

Music composed by Kalyani Malik. Music released on ADITYA Music Company.

Release
The film was released on 1 June 2012 worldwide after so many postponements.

Critical reception
Film was critically panned by many reviewers for its lack of fresh ideas and presentation. It was viewed as a rehash of many of Balakrishna's previous movies. The Times of India website gave an average rating of 2.5/5 for the film. The CNN-IBN website stated that "Adhinayakudu doesn't deserve any special mention due to its tried and tested old storyline". The NDTV Movies website stated that "Ironically, Adhinayakudu is a travesty of a film". The "SuperGoodMovies" website also gave an average rating of 2.5/5 for the film.

References

External links
 

2012 films
2010s Telugu-language films
Indian action drama films
2012 action drama films
Reliance Entertainment films